Pansa Meesatham (born 26 August 1996) is a Thai former footballer who played as a goalkeeper.

He played for BEC Tero Sasana in the ASEAN Club Championship 2003, where the club finished runners'-up. He represented Thailand at the 2000 AFC Asian Cup.

References

External Links

1974 births
Living people
Pansa Meesatham
Pansa Meesatham
Pansa Meesatham
2000 AFC Asian Cup players
Pansa Meesatham
Pansa Meesatham
Pansa Meesatham
Pansa Meesatham
Pansa Meesatham
Pansa Meesatham
Association football goalkeepers
Pansa Meesatham
Player-coaches
Pansa Meesatham